Pseudotyphistes is a genus of South American sheet weavers that was first described by Paolo Marcello Brignoli in 1972.

Species
 it contains seven species, found in Uruguay, Argentina, Peru, and Brazil:
Pseudotyphistes biriva Rodrigues & Ott, 2007 – Brazil
Pseudotyphistes cambara (Ott & Lise, 1997) – Brazil
Pseudotyphistes cristatus (Ott & Lise, 1997) – Brazil
Pseudotyphistes ludibundus (Keyserling, 1886) – Peru
Pseudotyphistes pallidus (Millidge, 1991) – Argentina
Pseudotyphistes pennatus Brignoli, 1972 (type) – Uruguay
Pseudotyphistes vulpiscaudatus (Ott & Lise, 1997) – Brazil

See also
 List of Linyphiidae species (I–P)

References

Araneomorphae genera
Linyphiidae
Spiders of South America